The Drincea is a left tributary of the river Danube in Romania. It discharges into the Danube near Cetate.

References

Rivers of Romania
Rivers of Mehedinți County
Rivers of Dolj County